Fear and Bullets is an soundtrack album by Trust Obey created through a collaboration between James O'Barr and longtime friend John Bergin as a soundtrack to O'Barr's graphic novel The Crow. It was originally released in 1994 along with a limited edition hardcover copy of the graphic novel. The release also coincided with the publicity received from the film. In 1998, Fear and Bullets was re-released with a new cover, almost all the songs completely re-recorded or remixed, and the addition of two new tracks (but other two were removed). The release included previously unreleased drawings by O'Barr.

Track listings

1994 version 
 Fear And Bullets - 6:36
  - 1:54 
 The Tides Of Sin - 9:21 
 Don't Look - 3:14 
 Lead Poisoning - 5:57 
 Seven Blackbirds - 10:40 
 True Love Always - 4:19 
 Sleeping Angel - 6:44 
 The Blessing Of The Pig - 11:44 
 The Crow - 7:54 
 Forever, Now - 3:42

1998 version 
 Lead Poisoning - 5:55
 Seven Blackbirds - 11:02
 A Murder Of Crows - 1:36
 The Tides Of Sin - 9:19
 C17H19N03 - 1:53
 Fear And Bullets - 5:54
 Sleeping Angel (The Dreaming) - 6:56
 True Love Always - 4:18
 The Blessing Of The Pig - 11:41
 The Crow - 9:07
 Now, Forever - 4:21

Release history

References

External links 
 
 Fear and Bullets at Bandcamp
 Fear and Bullets at iTunes

Book soundtracks
1994 soundtrack albums
The Crow
Trust Obey albums